Jérôme Cazalbou (born April 30, 1969 in Toulouse) is a retired rugby union player in the Top 14.

Jérôme Cazalbou's position of choice was scrum-half. He played four caps for Stade Toulousain, of which he won seven French championship. He earned his first cap for the France national team on October 18, 1997, against Italy. He retired from playing at the end of the 2000-2001 season after a new title with season spent with Stade Toulousain.

External links
ESPN profile

1969 births
Living people
French rugby union players
France international rugby union players
Stade Toulousain players
Rugby union scrum-halves